Montán is a municipality in the comarca of Alto Mijares, Castellón, Valencia, Spain.

See also
List of municipalities of Spain
Municipalities of Spain

References

Municipalities in the Province of Castellón
Alto Mijares